Cheilymenia granulata is a species of apothecial fungus belonging to the family Pyronemataceae.

This is a very common European species appearing throughout the year (most commonly in summer and autumn) as tiny orange-red discs up to 2 mm in diameter, thickly clustered on dung, usually from cows.

Many publications place this species in a separate genus, Coprobia.

References

Cheilymenia granulata at Species Fungorum

Pyronemataceae
Fungi described in 1790